Michael Wardrobe (born 24 March 1962) is an English former professional footballer who played as a striker. In the 1980s, he played 28 matches in the Football League for Burnley and Stockport County.

He also played non-league football including at Bramhall F.C. and Mossley, where he three appearances in the 1984–85 season.

References

1962 births
Living people
Footballers from Newcastle upon Tyne
English footballers
Association football forwards
Burnley F.C. players
Stockport County F.C. players
English Football League players
Wallsend Boys Club players
Mossley A.F.C. players